A Nordic cross flag is a flag bearing the design of the Nordic or Scandinavian cross, a cross symbol in a rectangular field, with the centre of the cross shifted towards the hoist.

All independent Nordic countries have adopted such flags in the modern period, and while the Nordic cross is named for its use in the national flags of the Nordic nations, the term is used universally by vexillologists, in reference not only to the flags of the Nordic countries but to other flags with similar designs. The sideways cross is also known as the Cross of Saint Philip the Apostle, who preached not in Scandinavia but in Greece, Phrygia and Syria instead.

The cross design represents Christianity, and was first seen in the Dannebrog, the national flag of Denmark in the first half of the 13th century. The same design, but with a red Nordic cross on a yellow background, was used as union flag during the Kalmar union (1397 to 1523), and when that union fell apart in 1523 the same design, but with a yellow cross on a blue background (derived from the Swedish coat of arms adopted in 1442), was adopted as national flag of Sweden, while Norway adopted their flag in 1821. From its adoption in the early 16th century until 1906 the background of the flag of Sweden was dark blue, but was changed to the currently used lighter shade of blue in a new flag law that was adopted in 1906, after the dissolution of the union between Sweden and Norway. After gaining independence the other Nordic countries adopted national flags of the same design, Iceland in 1915 and Finland in 1917. The Norwegian flag was the first Nordic cross flag with three colours. 
All Nordic flags may be flown as gonfalons as well.

Flag formats

Flags of the Nordic countries
Note that some of these flags are historical. Also, note that flag proportions may vary between the different flags and sometimes even between different versions of the same flag.

The Flag of Greenland is the only national flag of a Nordic country or territory without a Nordic Cross. When Greenland was granted home rule, the present flag — with a graphic design unique to Greenland — was adopted in June 1985, supported by fourteen votes against eleven who supported a proposed green-and-white Nordic cross.

Denmark

Finland

Iceland

Norway

Sweden

Kalmar Union
This is the historical flag of the Kalmar Union, which united Denmark, Sweden and Norway from 1397 to 1523. No pictorial evidence survives of the Kalmar Union's Flag. The flag appearing here is a reconstruction based on references in 1430 letters by King Eric of Pomerania.

Unofficial Nordic flags
These flags either do not have official status or represent various private entities. They have not been officially adopted and their use remains limited.

Nordic cross flags outside the Nordic countries

Armenia

Brazil

Estonia

France

Georgia

Germany
Nordic flag designs very similar to Denmark's, Sweden's, and Norway's national flags were proposed as Germany's national flags in both 1919 and 1948, after World War I and World War II, respectively. Today, the Nordic cross is a feature in some city and district flags or coats of arms.

Hungary

Latvia

Lithuania

Netherlands

Russia

Spain

Teutonic Order

Ukraine

United Kingdom
A number of flags for localities in the United Kingdom (primarily Scotland) are based on Nordic cross designs, intended to reflect the Scandinavian heritage introduced to the British Isles during the Viking Age and through the High Middle Ages.

United States

Other

Ethnic flags

Sport societies

Fictional

See also 

Flags of Central America
Flag of Greenland
Flag of Sámi
Flag of Gran Colombia
Pan-African colours
Pan-Arab colours
Pan-Slavic colours
Southern Cross Flag
Union Flag
Tricolour
Saint George's Cross

References

Bibliography

External links

Extensive compilation of official and non-official Nordic Cross flags (at Flags of the World).

Lists and galleries of flags
Nordic countries
Christian crosses
 
Types of flags
Christian symbols